Ariarathes IV, surnamed Eusebes, "the Pious", (Ariaráthēs Eusebḗs), was the king of Cappadocia in 220–163 BC.

Early life 
Ariarathes IV was the son of the king of Cappadocia Ariarathes III and his Macedonian Greek wife Stratonice. He was a child at his accession, and reigned for about 57 years. He married his cousin Antiochis, the daughter of Antiochus III the Great, king of Syria, and Laodice III, and, in consequence of this alliance, assisted Antiochus in his war against the Romans. After the defeat of Antiochus by the Romans in 190 BC, Ariarathes sued for peace in 188, which he obtained on favourable terms, as his daughter, Stratonice, was about that time betrothed to Eumenes II, king of Pergamum, whom she later married, and became an ally of the Romans. In 183–179 , he assisted Eumenes in his war against Pharnaces, king of Pontus. Polybius mentions that a Roman embassy was sent to Ariarathes after the death of the Seleucid Antiochus IV Epiphanes, who died 164. 

Antiochis, the wife of Ariarathes, is said to have at first borne him no children, and accordingly substituted two surrogates, who were called Ariarathes and Orophernes. Subsequently, however, it was said that she actually bore her husband two daughters and a son, who was named Mithridates, and afterwards became Ariarathes V, and then she informed Ariarathes of the deceit she had practiced upon him. The two surrogates were in consequence sent away from Cappadocia, one to Rome, the other to Ionia.

Notes

References
Appian, The foreign wars, Horace White (translator), New York, (1899)
Hazel, John; Who's Who in the Greek World, "Ariarathes IV", (1999)
Head, Barclay; Historia Numorum, "Cappadocia", (1911)
Justin; Epitome of Pompeius Trogus, John Selby Watson (translator); London, (1886)
Livy; Ab urbe condita, Canon Roberts (translator); New York, (1905)
Polybius; Histories, Evelyn S. Shuckburgh (translator); London - New York, (1889)
 Settipani, Christian Les Ancêtres de Charlemagne (France: Éditions Christian, 1989).

Kings of Cappadocia
3rd-century BC births
2nd-century BC rulers in Asia
3rd-century BC rulers
2nd-century BC deaths
Ariarathid dynasty